Mardanaqom (also Romanized as Mardānāqom; also known as Mard Agham, Mardānqom, Mardenaum, and Merdenaum) is a village in Dizmar-e Sharqi Rural District, Minjavan District, Khoda Afarin County, East Azerbaijan Province, Iran. At the 2006 census, its population was 730, in 176 families.

Situation
Mardanaqom has been first mentioned by the renowned historian Hamdallah Mustawfi in the late twelfth century. At the time, apparently, Mardanaqom was the capital of a thriving district.

According to reports from Iranian Army files, there was reported a population of 639 people in late 1940s.  According to more recent statistics (2012) the population is 605 people in 205 families. Therefore, Mardanaqom is one of the most populated villages of Khoda Afarin County.

In 1986, Mardanaqom was designated as the capital of Dizmar-e Sharqi Rural District.

Pomegranate Festival
The village is a renowned center of Pomegranate and grape production in Arasbaran region. These produces have a characteristic potential of being preserved for over six months without requiring refrigeration. This feature was remarked by Robert Mignan, who traveled through Arasbaran in 1830s.  Every year, in the second half of October, a Pomegranate Festival is organized by the provincial authorities in the village. The main feature of the festival is performance of Ashugh music.

Further Information
On a mountain near the village, there is a castle dating from Sasanian era. It was used as a jail for high-ranking officials during Khwarazmian reign.

References 

Populated places in Khoda Afarin County